Colosi is an Italian surname. Notable people with the surname include:

Giuseppe Colosi (1892–1975), Italian zoologist
Nick Colosi (1927–2005), Italian-American baseball umpire

Italian-language surnames